Gerald Edward Sikorski (born April 26, 1948) is an American politician, lobbyist, and lawyer from Minnesota. He was the U.S. representative for Minnesota's 6th congressional district as a DFL member, serving 5 terms from January 3, 1983 to January 3, 1993.

Biography 
Sikorski graduated with a Bachelor of Arts degree, summa cum laude from the University of Minnesota in 1970 and a Juris Doctor from the University of Minnesota Law School in 1973; he was admitted to the Minnesota bar in 1973 and commenced practice in Stillwater. He served in the Minnesota Senate from 1976 to 1982.

Congress  
During his time in Congress, he served as Whip-at-Large and as a member of the Committees on Energy and Commerce and Post Office and Civil Service. 

Sikorski was defeated by Rod Grams in 1992 after he was revealed to have had 697 overdrafts on the House Bank, which he attributed to his and his wife's sloppy bookkeeping.

Later career 
After his departure from Congress, Sikorski became a Washington attorney and lobbyist. 

He is Polish American.

References

Sources

1948 births
Living people
People from Breckenridge, Minnesota
American politicians of Polish descent
Democratic Party Minnesota state senators
Minnesota lawyers
University of Minnesota alumni
University of Minnesota Law School alumni
Democratic Party members of the United States House of Representatives from Minnesota
Members of Congress who became lobbyists